The IBM 740 CRT Recorder was announced in 1954 and used with the IBM 701, IBM 704, and IBM 709 computers to draw vector graphics images, point by point, on 35 mm photographic film (i.e. microfilm). The 740 film recorder contained digital-to-analog converters and a 7-inch, high precision, electrostatic CRT. The raster size was 1,024 by 1,024, but only 256 resolved spots could be displayed on a vertical or horizontal line. Points could be displayed in one of two intensities, and a line could be drawn from a point, vertically or horizontally, to the edge of the display to form an axis.

Each point to be displayed was stored in a single 36 bit word, with 10 bits each for the X and Y coordinates, and 3 control bits, one to set either high or low intensity and two to indicate that an X or Y axis is to be drawn starting from the given point. If both the X and Y axis bits were set, a 45 degree line was drawn.

The 740's CRT used a short persistence P11 phosphor. The film used was 35 mm and was stored in a magazine that could hold up to 100 feet. ASA 200 speed film was recommended. The film could be advanced under computer control.

The IBM 780 CRT Display was a monitor that could be attached to the 740 and mirror to an operator what was being drawn on 740's CRT. The 780 had a 21-inch CRT with a longer persistence (2 second, nominal) P7 phosphor.

See also
IBM 2250
Phosphor#Standard phosphor types

References
IBM 709 Data Processing System, Form A22-6501-0, 1958, p. 106ff.
IBM Archive article about the 740

External links
CRT Phosphor Characteristics

740
Display 740
History of human–computer interaction